This is a list of foreign ministers of Vanuatu.

1980–1983: Walter Lini
1983: Donald Kalpokas
1983–1987: Sela Molisa
1987–1991: Donald Kalpokas
1988: Barak Sopé (in opposition)
1991: Edward Natapei
1991–1993: Serge Vohor
1993–1995: Maxime Carlot Korman
1995–1996: Alfred Maseng
1996: Amos Bangabiti
1996–1997: Willie Jimmy
1997: Amos Andeng
1997–1998: Vital Soksok
1998: Donald Kalpokas
1998–1999: Clement Leo
1999–2001: Serge Vohor
2001–2002: Alain Mahe
2002–2003: Serge Vohor
2003–2004: Moana Carcasses Kalosil
2004: Barak Sopé
2004: Marcellino Pipite
2004–2007: Sato Kilman
2007–2008: George Wells
2008–2009: Bakoa Kaltongga
2009–2010: Joe Natuman
2010–2011: George Wells
2011: Joe Natuman
2011: George Wells
2011: Alfred Carlot
2011: Joe Natuman
2011–2013: Alfred Carlot
2013–2014: Edward Natapei
2014–2015: Sato Kilman
2015: Kalvau Moli
2015: Serge Vohor
November 2015–January 2016: Havo Molisale (acting)
2016–2017: Bruno Leingkone
2017–2019: Ralph Regenvanu
2019-Present: Marc Ati

References

Sources
Rulers.org – Foreign ministers S–Z

Foreign
Foreign Ministers
Politicians